Yaakoubi is a surname. Notable people with the surname include:

Kais Yâakoubi (born 1966), Tunisian footballer and manager
Manel Yaakoubi (born 1992), Algerian volleyball player

See also
 Redouan El Yaakoubi (born 1996), Dutch footballer
 Yaacoubi